Repin (masculine) or Repina (feminine) is a Russian last name. It is derived from the sobriquet "репа" ("turnip") and may refer to the following people:
Ilya Repin (1844–1930), Russian painter
Nikolay Repin (b. 1932), Soviet painter
Vadim Repin (b. 1971), Russian violinist

Archaeology
The Repin culture, the first phase (or, depending on the author, the forerunner) of the Pit Grave/Ochre Grave/Yamnaya culture.

Other uses
Řepín, a village and municipality of the Czech Republic.
2468 Repin, a Main-belt Asteroid named after Ilya Repin.

See also
Repino, several inhabited localities in Russia

Russian-language surnames